Second-seeded Jack Crawford defeated first-seeded, and reigning champion, Henri Cochet 8–6, 6–1, 6–3 in the final to win the men's singles tennis title at the 1933 French Championships.

Seeds
The seeded players are listed below. Jack Crawford is the champion; others show the round in which they were eliminated.

  Henri Cochet (finalist)
  Jack Crawford (champion)
  Fred Perry (quarterfinals)
  Daniel Prenn (fourth round)
  Giorgio de Stefani (fourth round)
  Jiro Satoh (semifinals)
  Frank Shields (fourth round)
  Roderich Menzel (quarterfinals)
  Vivian McGrath (second round)
  Christian Boussus (quarterfinals)
  Colin Robbins (fourth round)
  Ryosuke Nunoi (third round)
  Harry Lee (semifinals)
  Hendrik Timmer (second round)
  Patrick Hughes (third round)
  Vernon Kirby (second round)

Draw

Key
 Q = Qualifier
 WC = Wild card
 LL = Lucky loser
 r = Retired

Finals

Earlier rounds

Section 1

Section 2

Section 3

Section 4

Section 5

Section 6

Section 7

Section 8

References

1933 in French tennis
1933